Pieter Jacobszoon (23 August 1903 – 14 February 1972) was a Dutch swimmer. He competed in the men's 100 metre freestyle event at the 1924 Summer Olympics.

References

External links
 

1903 births
1972 deaths
Olympic swimmers of the Netherlands
Swimmers at the 1924 Summer Olympics
Swimmers from Amsterdam
Dutch male freestyle swimmers
20th-century Dutch people